Tunnel of love may refer to:

Amusement rides and railways
 Tunnel of Love (railway), a section of industrial railway located near Klevan, Ukraine
 Tunnel of love (ride), an amusement park boat ride
 Tunnel of Love, the name of several amusement rides at Coney Island

Arts, entertainment, and media

Music

Albums and EPs
 Tunnel of Love (album), a 1987 Bruce Springsteen album
 Tunnel of Love (EP), a 1996 EP by Insane Clown Posse

Songs
 "Tunnel of Love" (Dire Straits song), a 1980 Dire Straits song
 "Tunnel of Love" (Bruce Springsteen song), title song from the album
 Tunnel of Love Express Tour, tour by Bruce Springsteen and the E Street Band promoting the album
 "The Tunnel of Love" (song), a 1983 song by Fun Boy Three from the album Waiting
 "Tunnel of Love", a song by Westlife from the 2000 Platinum edition of Westlife (album)

Other arts, entertainment, and media
 The Tunnel of Love, a 1954 novel by Peter De Vries
 The Tunnel of Love (play), a 1957 Broadway play by De Vries and Joseph Fields; the basis for the film
 The Tunnel of Love, a 1958 film starring Doris Day